"The Deal" is the ninth episode of the second season of NBC's Seinfeld, and the show's 14th episode overall. The episode centers on protagonists Jerry (Jerry Seinfeld) and Elaine Benes (Julia Louis-Dreyfus) who decide to have a sexual relationship, with a set of ground rules. However, as their "relationship" progresses, they experience difficulties maintaining their original friendship.

Series co-creator Larry David wrote the episode in a response to NBC's continued efforts to get the two characters back together. The main inspiration behind the episode was a similar agreement David once made with a woman. The episode, which introduced the character of Tina, Elaine's roommate, first aired on May 2, 1991 and was watched by approximately 22.6 million viewers. Critics reacted positively to the episode, and David received a Primetime Emmy Award nomination for Outstanding Writing for a Comedy Series.

Plot
As they are watching TV in Jerry's apartment, Jerry and Elaine flip through the channels, stumbling upon a soft-core pornography channel. Upon the realization that neither of them has had sexual relations in a while, they start toying with the idea of sleeping together while, at the same time, preserving  their normal close friendship. However, as they do not wish to ruin that friendship they establish a set of ground rules. Happy with their agreement, referred  to within the conversation as "this" (the friendship) and "that" (the sexual intimacy), they make their way to the bedroom. The next day Jerry has lunch with his friend George Costanza (Jason Alexander), and tells him of his situation with Elaine. George remains skeptical, even after Jerry explains the rules system to him. Jerry and Elaine get into an argument over the second rule: "Spending the night is optional". Jerry eventually does not spend the night at Elaine's apartment, leaving their agreement on shaky terms.

With Elaine's birthday coming up Jerry has to decide on what to get her. Since they are friends but they are still having sex he feels that the symbolism of the gift needs to be carefully thought out. He looks for a gift with George but is unable to think of anything, though he remembers her saying "something about a bench". Elaine is unhappy with the eventual gift ($182 cash) and outright insulted by the platonic gift card. When Jerry's neighbor Kramer (Michael Richards) gives Elaine the bench she was looking for, for which she is very grateful, she and Jerry talk over their agreement. Jerry proposes that they go back to simply being friends, but Elaine is so upset by the birthday debacle that she feels unable to go on with either a friendly or sexual relationship with Jerry, stating that what she wanted all along was "this ... that ... and the other."

While eating at the coffee shop the next day Jerry tells George that the future of any sustained contact with Elaine, either relationship or friendship, is in serious jeopardy. Together they imagine the possibility of a chance meeting with Elaine, then married  to someone else, five years in the future; they then humorously declare they'd have to kill the hypothetical husband, only to weigh the terrifying penal repercussions of committing such a crime. At that point, Jerry acknowledges that his next phone call with Elaine will be a make-it-or-break-it conversation. When Kramer sees them again, however, Jerry and Elaine have made up and are a couple.

Production

Series co-creator Larry David wrote the episode, which was directed by Tom Cherones. Since the start of the show, NBC executives, especially Warren Littlefield, had been pressuring the writing staff to get Jerry and Elaine back together. Larry David had been against this idea from the start. However, brainstorming for an episode idea, he remembered he had once made a deal with a woman to have a purely physical relationship, which he thought "would make a really funny show, even if they had never [told us to get Jerry and Elaine back together]". Though Jerry and Elaine are still in a relationship at the end of the episode, they are no longer together by the end of the season. This was because "The Deal" was the last episode filmed for the season, but like most of the episodes in the second season, it was aired out of order. Jerry and Elaine are not together, however, by the start of the third season. Seinfeld and David decided that they had satisfied the NBC executives and went back to the original format. Seinfeld and David have also noted that "The Deal" is the only Seinfeld episode ever to contain sincere emotions, during the scene in which Jerry and Elaine discuss the ending of their physical relationship.

On February 25, 1991, the table-read of the episode was held, subsequent filming occurred at CBS Studio Center in Studio City, Los Angeles, California three days later. "The Deal" is the first episode in which Elaine's apartment is shown. During rehearsals controversy arose over how Jerry and Elaine would sit during their "this and that" conversation. Several producers believed that, as the scene was intimate, the two should sit close together. David, however, believed the discussion was more of a transaction than an intimate scene and felt that Jerry and Elaine should sit farther apart. On audio commentary recorded for the Seinfeld: Volume 1 DVD set, David commented that when he showed his idea of the scene, "I remember everybody saying 'there's no heat, there's no heat', and I said, that's the point, there's not supposed to be any". David and producer Andrew Scheinman got into a big argument over the issue, which David eventually won.

Aside from showing Elaine's apartment for the first time, "The Deal" also marks the first appearance of Elaine's roommate Tina, who had been mentioned in earlier episodes. Siobhan Fallon was cast in the role; she would reprise the character two more times, in season three's "The Truth" and in the season five finale "The Opposite". Norman Brenner, who worked as Richards' stand-in on the show for all its nine seasons, appears as an extra, working in the store George and Jerry visit to look for a gift for Elaine.

Reception
"The Deal" was first broadcast on May 2, 1991 on NBC and received a Nielsen rating of 15.5 and an audience share of 25, indicating that 15.5 percent of American households watched the episode, and that 25 percent of all televisions in use at the time were tuned into it. With averagely 22.6 million homes watching the episode, the series was the eleventh most-watched show in the week it was broadcast, tied with NBC's The Golden Girls. David received a Primetime Emmy Award nomination for Outstanding Writing in a Comedy Series, but lost the award to Gary Dontzig and Steven Peterman, writers of the Murphy Brown episode "Jingle Hell, Jingle Hell, Jingle All the Way".

Critics reacted positively to the episode. Eric Kohanik of The Hamilton Spectator called "The Deal" an "hilarious episode". Entertainment Weekly critics Mike Flaherty and Mary Kaye Schilling commented "Jerry and Elaine's circuitous verbal dance pondering the relative worth of that [sex] versus this [the friendship] is sublime. The show's ability to be both explicit and vague will become a hallmark."

References

External links

Seinfeld (season 2) episodes
1991 American television episodes
Television episodes written by Larry David